Philip Morant  (6 October 1700 – 25 November 1770) was an English clergyman, author and historian.

Education
He was educated at John Roysse's Free School in Abingdon (now Abingdon School) and Pembroke College, Oxford, eventually taking his master's degree at Sidney Sussex College, Cambridge in 1729.

Career
Ordained in 1722, he began his association with the county of Essex with a curacy at Great Waltham near Chelmsford in 1722. He was the Chaplain of the English Episcopal Church in Amsterdam from 1732 to 1734. In 1737 he became both the Rector of St Mary-at-the-Walls, Colchester as well as Rector of Aldham in Essex. During his time in Colchester, Morant wrote The History and Antiquities of Colchester, published in 1748; and his county history, The History and Antiquities of the County of Essex, published in two volumes between 1763 and 1768. He also conducted a number of excavations of Roman sites in and around the town. He married Anne Stebbing in 1739 and they had a daughter, Anna Maria. In 1755, Philip Morant was elected to the Fellowship of the Society of Antiquaries of London.

After the death of his wife, he moved to his son-in-law's house in Battersea and was employed in the House of Lords, although he retained the living of both his parishes. He died in 1770 and is buried at Aldham, where his silhouette appears on the village sign.

There is a contemporary memorial and a window of 1855 in his memory in the new church at Aldham (the memorial was moved in 1854), and there is a wooden plaque at St Mary-at-the-Walls dated 1966. The Morant Club was formed in Colchester in 1909 to investigate local archeology, but was dissolved in 1925. In 1965, The Norman Way Secondary School in Prettygate, Colchester was renamed Philip Morant School and College in his honour.

See also
 List of Old Abingdonians

References

External links

Genealogical information retrieved from the papers of Thomas Astle (1735-1803), Keeper of the records. Droet Morant or Drouet Mourant

18th-century English historians
People from Essex
People educated at Abingdon School
1700 births
1770 deaths
Alumni of Pembroke College, Oxford
Alumni of Sidney Sussex College, Cambridge
English antiquarians
18th-century antiquarians
Fellows of the Society of Antiquaries of London